The 2010 SBS Drama Awards is a ceremony honoring the best performances in television on the SBS network for the year 2010. It took place on December 31, 2010, at the SBS Open Hall in Deungchon-dong, Seoul, and was hosted by Lee Beom-soo, Park Jin-hee and Lee Soo-kyung.

Nominations and winners
(Winners denoted in bold)

Top 10 Stars
Go Hyun-jung – Daemul
Ha Ji-won – Secret Garden
Hyun Bin – Secret Garden
Jeong Bo-seok – Giant
Kim So-yeon – Prosecutor Princess, Dr. Champ
Kwon Sang-woo – Daemul
Lee Beom-soo – Giant
Lee Seung-gi – My Girlfriend Is a Nine-Tailed Fox
Park Jin-hee – Giant
Shin Min-ah – My Girlfriend Is a Nine-Tailed Fox

New Star Award
Choi Siwon – Oh! My Lady
Ham Eun-jung – Coffee House
Han Chae-ah – Definitely Neighbors
Hwang Jung-eum – Giant
Joo Sang-wook – Giant
Kim Soo-hyun – Giant
Nam Gyu-ri – Life Is Beautiful
No Min-woo – My Girlfriend Is a Nine-Tailed Fox

References

External links
 

SBS
SBS Drama Awards
SBS
December 2010 events in South Korea